The Loder Baronetcy, of Whittlebury in the County of Northampton, and of High Beeches in Slaugham in the County of Sussex, was created in the Baronetage of the United Kingdom on 27 July 1887 for Robert Loder, who had previously represented New Shoreham in the House of Commons as a Conservative.

Gerald Loder, 1st Baron Wakehurst, was the fifth son of the first Baronet.

Loder baronets, of Whittlebury and High Beeches (1887)
Sir Robert Loder, 1st Baronet (1823–1888)
Sir Edmund Giles Loder, 2nd Baronet (1849–1920)
Sir Giles Rolls Loder, 3rd Baronet (1914–1999)
Sir Edmund Jeune Loder, 4th Baronet (born 1941)

See also
Baron Wakehurst

References
Kidd, Charles, Williamson, David (editors). Debrett's Peerage and Baronetage (1990 edition). New York: St Martin's Press, 1990.

Loder